The Kontrovod is a river in Primorsky Krai, Russia. It rises in the Strelnikov Range of Sikhote-Alin. The Kontrovod is a left tributary of the Bikin.

Luchegorsk was founded on the banks of the river. There is an electric power station's reservoir on the river in Luchegorsk.

References

Rivers of Primorsky Krai